Boroughmuir RFC is a rugby union football club in the Scottish Rugby Union.

Founded in 1919 and admitted to the SRU in 1939, it was originally restricted to former pupils of Boroughmuir High School. The badge is derived from Boroughmuir High School and they acquired it in 1913. Although it has lost that direct connection, the home ground and navy blue/emerald colours are unchanged.

The club won the Scottish unofficial club rugby championship in the 1954–55 and 1972–73 seasons. The club have the second longest number of seasons in the top division having only been relegated twice and on both occasions bouncing straight back up to the top division. The record is held by Heriots FP who have never been relegated. Boroughmuir became the first team to win the Scottish Cup "back to back" in 2001, and the first team to win it three times in 2015.

The club were awarded one of the semi pro Super Six franchises to commence season 2019/20.
Former Scotland International Graham Shiel has been appointed head coach of the Super Six Squad

The club's ground (Meggetland) has recently undergone major development to turn it into one of the premier facilities in Scottish rugby. A new stand and clubhouse were built, along with new pitches for the 2nd and 3rd XV, an international standard all-weather hockey pitch and five-a-side football pitches.

Current squad

Glasgow Warriors players drafted:

Table

Sevens

The club run the Boroughmuir / Capital Sevens tournament.

Honours

 Scottish Premiership
 Champions (3): 1990–91, 2002–03, 2007–08
 Scottish National League Division One
 Champions (2): 1999–00, 2013–14
 Scottish Cup
 Champions (4): 1999–00, 2000–01, 2004–05, 2014-15
 Runners-Up (1): 1996-97
 Capital Sevens
 Champions (2): 2010, 2012
 Glasgow City Sevens
 Champions (1): 2003
 Melrose Sevens
 Champions (2): 1963, 2002
Kelso Sevens
 Champions (1): 1977
 Langholm Sevens
 Champions (2): 1975, 1978
 Hawick Sevens
 Champions (3): 1978, 1987, 2019
 Gala Sevens
 Champions (1): 2006
 Peebles Sevens
 Champions (5): 1959, 1969, 1980, 2003, 2006
 Selkirk Sevens
 Champions (1): 2019
Walkerburn Sevens
 Champions (3): 1931, 1933, 1949
 North Berwick Sevens
 Champions (1): 2021
 Edinburgh Charity Sevens
 Champions (1): 1970
 Royal HSFP Sevens
 Champions (5): 1973, 1974, 1976, 1980, 1983
 Portobello Sevens
 Champions (2): 1986, 1987
 Caithness Sevens
 Champions (2): 1995, 1998
 Forrester Sevens
 Champions (2): 1988, 1989
 Alloa Sevens
 Champions (1): 1984
 Lismore Sevens
 Champions (9): 1974, 1980, 1981, 1992, 1993, 1994, 1995, 1996, 2001
 Penicuik Sevens
 Champions (3): 1994, 1995, 1998
 Holy Cross Sevens
 Champions (1): 1998
 Haddington Sevens
 Champions (6): 1976, 1980, 1981, 1994, 2008, 2019
 Glasgow Academicals Sevens
 Champions (1): 1970
 Kilmarnock Sevens
 Champions (5): 1961, 1969, 1970, 1976, 1977
 Musselburgh Sevens
 Champions (4): 1961, 1969, 1970, 1972
 Kirkcaldy Sevens
 Champions (4): 1951, 1952, 1953, 1955
 Howe of Fife Sevens
 Champions (1): 1987
 Stirling Sevens
 Champions (2): 1951, 2011
 Currie Sevens
 Champions (3): 1983, 1989, 1996
 Edinburgh Northern Sevens
 Champions (1): 2011

Notable players
Famous players associated with Boroughmuir RFC:
Nick Mardon, London Broncos rugby league
Kenny Ross, the first capped Boroughmuir player, 10 Scottish caps 1961–63
Sean Lineen, Scotland International the original kilted Kiwi and former Boroughmuir coach. Current Scotland Under 20 Coach
Iain Paxton, British Lions Scotland & Barbarians forward and former Boroughmuir, Edinburgh & Scotland U-21 coach
Derek Stark, Scotland winger
Mike Blair, British Lions and Scotland scrum half
Chris Cusiter, British Lions and Scotland scrum half
Graeme Beverage, Scotland Scrum half and Edinburgh Rugby Academy Manager
Kevin Park, Glasgow, Flanker
Tom Palmer, England lock
Peter Wright, British Lions and Scotland prop former 1st XV Head coach & BBC Radio Scotland rugby pundit
Bruce Hay, British Lions, Scotland & Barbarians Full Back & Wing, former Head Coach & Director of Rugby
Alasdair Strokosch, Scotland flanker
Norrie Rowan, Scotland & Barbarians Prop member of 1984 Grand Slam squad
 Bill Watson, Scotland & Barbarians No 8, Former SRU Chief Executive and Current Boroughmuir Vice Chairman
 Stuart Reid, Scotland No 8 and former forwards coach also played at Leeds & Narbonne
 Dave Callam, Scotland No 8 and flanker
 Graham Hogg, Scotland Centre and former coach
 Graeme Beveridge, Scotland Scrum Half
 Jim Fleming MBE,  =International Referee 
 Peter Hoffmann (runner), former Boroughmuir High School rugby player international athlete and author
 Henry Edwards, flanker, former SRU Head of Coach Development
 Chris Tregaskis, New Zealand Second Row
 Mark Cooksly, New Zealand Second Row
 Ronnie Browne, former winger and member of folk duo The Corries
 Damien Hoyland, Scotland International & Scotland 7's 
 Sep Visser, Wing, Dutch International, brother of Scotland International Tim Visser
 Murray Buchan, Scrum Half & Team GB Olympic Half Pipe Skier 2014 & 2018 Winter Games
 Ollie Brown, Scotland Commonwealth Games 7's 2010
 Ben Fisher, Former Scotland Under 20 Forwards Coach, New Zealand Rugby Performance Coach, Scotland Club International
 Andy Rose, Zimbabwe International and Captain, Scotland Club International
 Rik Van Boulkom, Dutch International Scrum Half
 Magnus Bradbury, Scotland International & Scotland 7's
 Simon Bergan, Scotland International
 Jake Kerr, Scotland International
 Chris Laidlaw, Scotland Club International (Son of British Lion & Scotland legend Roy Laidlaw)
 Johnny Matthews, Glasgow Warriors, Scotland Club International
 Daryl Marfo, Scotland International

Current well known players include

 Tom Brown, Scotland International & Scotland 7's, Edinburgh Rugby
 Martin Cimprich Czech Republic International player
 Jordan Edmunds, Scotland 7's & Scotland Club International

References

Sources

 Massie, Allan: A Portrait of Scottish Rugby (Polygon, Edinburgh)
 Ian Nicholson '75 Years : A History Of Boroughmuir Rugby Club'
 Colin Renton edinburghnews.Scotsman.com/rugby/Boroughmuir-Rugby-Club-face-oldest-foes.5804593.jp 9Nov2009
 Jamie Scott
 Craig Dawson

External links
 Boroughmuir RFC website
 Debate goes on as new Meggetland opens doors Edinburgh Evening News, 10 November 2006.

Scottish rugby union teams
Rugby union in Edinburgh
Rugby clubs established in 1919
Sports teams in Edinburgh
1919 establishments in Scotland